Juan Maria Johnson Jose (8 August 1938 — 23 October 2018) was a Filipino tennis player.

Tennis career
Jose, as 17-year old, caught the eye of former world number one Frank Sedgman, who said he had the makings of a world-class player after seeing him compete in Manila. He made his Davis Cup debut for the Philippines in 1955.

In 1957 he had some noteworthy performances in a tour of Australia, including a win over Belgium's top player Philippe Washer at the South Australian championships. He also pushed Australian rising star Neale Fraser to 8–10 in the fifth set at the Victorian championships.

Jose took a set off Butch Buchholz in a 1960 Davis Cup tie against the United States.

At the 1962 Asian Games in Jakarta, Jose defeated Japan's Atsushi Miyagi in the singles final, to become the second (and most recent) Filipino to claim the singles gold medal.

In 1964 he won the decisive fifth rubber of the Davis Cup Eastern Inter-Zonal Final over Premjit Lall of India, setting up a tie against Sweden in Båstad which would be his final appearance.

Jose is a member of the Philippine Sports Hall of Fame.

References

External links
 
 
 

1938 births
2018 deaths
Filipino male tennis players
Asian Games medalists in tennis
Asian Games gold medalists for the Philippines
Asian Games silver medalists for the Philippines
Asian Games bronze medalists for the Philippines
Medalists at the 1958 Asian Games
Medalists at the 1962 Asian Games
Tennis players at the 1958 Asian Games
Tennis players at the 1962 Asian Games